Zaspopathy, also called ZASP-related myofibril myopathy, is a novel autosomal dominant form of progressive muscular dystrophy, first described in 2005.

Cause
The disease encompasses multiple forms of both distal and proximal myopathies, and is caused by mutations in the gene referred to as ZASP.

Pathophysiology

The ZASP gene is located at chromosome 10, and encodes also-called Z-disk-associated protein. Mutations in this protein causes disintegration of the Z-disk of contractile elements (myofibrils) in muscle cells.

Mutations of several other Z-disk related proteins, such as desmin, alfa-B-crystallin and myotilin can cause disorders similar to zaspopathy.

Diagnosis

Treatment

References

External links 
  (gene)

Autosomal dominant disorders
Rare diseases
Myoneural junction and neuromuscular diseases